"Close to Your Heart" is the fourth single released by British electronic dance music producer Jake Williams under the name JX, featuring vocals by singer Shèna (a.k.a. Shèna Winchester). It was released in February 1997 as a single only, peaking at number nine in Scotland and number 18 in the UK, as well as number one on the UK Dance Chart and number 53 on the Eurochart Hot 100. Additionally, it charted in Israel and Australia, peaking at number three and 90. A music video was produced to promote the single.

Critical reception
Juha Soininen noted in his 2020 book, Move Your Body (2 The 90's): Unlimited Eurodance, that "Close to Your Heart" "was a step to a more trancier sound."

Track listing
 12", UK & Europe
"Close to Your Heart" (JX Original Mix)
"Close to Your Heart" (JX Dub)
"Close to Your Heart" (The Immortals Remix)

 CD single, UK
"Close to Your Heart" (Original Edit) – 4:19
"Close to Your Heart" (JX Original Mix) – 9:12
"Close to Your Heart" (The Immortals Remix) – 12:12
"Close to Your Heart" (JX Dub) – 8:44

 CD maxi, Europe
"Close to Your Heart" (Original Edit) – 4:20
"Close to Your Heart" (Original Mix) – 9:10
"Close to Your Heart" (The Immortals Remix) – 11:16

Charts

References

 

1997 songs
1997 singles
FFRR Records singles
Jake Williams songs
Trance songs